At least three warships of Turkey have borne the name TCG Oruç Reis or Oruçreis:

  - an  ordered by Turkey from a United Kingdom shipyard but seized prior to her launch in 1940. She was commissioned in the Royal Navy as HMS P611 before being handed over to Turkey in 1942 and regaining her name. She was broken up in 1957.
  - a  launched in 1994

See also
, a research vessel

Turkish Navy ship names